Paulinów may refer to the following places:
Paulinów, Łódź Voivodeship (central Poland)
Paulinów, Lublin Voivodeship (east Poland)
Paulinów, Masovian Voivodeship (east-central Poland)
Paulinów, Greater Poland Voivodeship (west-central Poland)
Paulinów, Silesian Voivodeship (south Poland)